Steve Etches, MBE (born in 1949) is an English plumber, fossil collector and preparator in Kimmeridge, on the Isle of Purbeck. From an early age on, Etches began to find, collect and restore the fossils he found on the Jurassic Coast. His collection is now housed in a museum called The Etches Collection which was purpose-built, both to house the collection and to replace the deteriorating local village hall. Etches has won many prizes for his palaeontology and was made a Member of the Order of the British Empire by the Queen in 2014. In 2017, he also was awarded an Honorary Doctorate by the University of Southampton. On 22 April 2019, he appeared on the podcast Trees A Crowd with David Oakes.

Significant finds
Etches has been collecting for over 40 years, and in this time he has amassed an important collection of rare and unique fossils. His first find was a flint fossil sea urchin which he found at age 5.  His collection now contains about 2,800 specimens, many of which are scientifically significant.

Ammonite eggs
Whilst cephalopod eggs had previously been described twice within scientific literature, the discovery of 8 clusters of eggs in association with perisphinctid ammonite by Steve Etches, Jane Clarke and John Callomon in 2008 provides the best preserved example of this rare glimpse into the life cycle of ammonites.  The eggs show some phosphatic films suggesting that the eggs were already decaying at their time of burial.

Cuspicephalus
The skull of the pterosaur Cuspicephalus was collected from the Kimmeridge Clay by Etches in December 2009 and then named by him and David Martill in 2013. Pterosaurs are considered rare within the Kimmeridge Clay as the clays were deposited a considerable distance from land and so such finds are thought to result from crash landings, possibly as a result of poor weather. Such a landing on water would be likely be fatal to pterosaurs as their thin, hollow bones would be prone to breaking on impact with the sea, as seen in other pterosaur specimens collected by Steve.

Other finds
Other finds by Etches include an exceptionally well-preserved dragonfly wing; the oldest recorded barnacle displaying colour and a new genus of barnacle that has since been found living in the sea around Japan.  A Jurassic species of ray, Kimmerobatis etchesi and a deep diving ichthyosaur Thalassodraco etchesi was named in his honour. These specimens can all be seen in The Etches Collection museum.

Awards
 1993 – The Palaeontological Association's Award to Amateur Palaeontologists
 1994 – the R. H. Worth Prize of the Geological Society
 2005 – the Mary Anning Award of the Palaeontological Association
 2006 – Halstead medal of the Geologists' Association
 2014 – Member of the Most Excellent Order of the British Empire (MBE)
 2017 – Doctor of Science honoris causa from the University of Southampton
 2023 – Coke Medal of the Geological Society of London

References

External links
 The Etches Collection – official website of the collection and museum

1949 births
British plumbers
English palaeontologists
Living people
Members of the Order of the British Empire
People from Purbeck District